is a Japanese brand of consumer electronics. It has been owned by JVCKenwood ever since October 2011, when Kenwood Corporation merged with JVC. Kenwood manufactures audio equipment such as cassette tape decks/recorders, amateur radio (ham) equipment, radios, cellular phones, speakers, and other consumer electronics.

History
The company was established in 1946 as the Kasuga Radio Co. Ltd. in Komagane City, Nagano Prefecture, Japan. In 1960, the company was renamed Trio Corporation. In 1963, the first overseas office was founded in Los Angeles County, California, USA.

In the early 1960s, Trio's products were rebranded by the Lafayette Radio Company, with a focus on citizens' band radio.

A&A Trading Co. was an importer of Japanese-made electronics for RadioShack, and a bilingual Japanese-speaking manager from A&A, William "Bill" Kasuga, partnered with George Aratani and Yoichi Nakase to establish a company that would be the exclusive importer of Trio products.

The name Kenwood was invented by Kasuga as being the combination of "Ken", a name common to Japan and North America that had been tested and proven acceptable to American consumers in the name of Kenmore appliances, and "Wood", referring to the durable substance as well as suggesting a relation to Hollywood, California. The brand recognition of Kenwood eventually surpassed that of Trio, and in 1986 Trio bought Kenwood and renamed itself Kenwood. George Aratani was the first chairman of Kenwood USA Corporation and was succeeded by Kasuga. In October 2008, Kenwood merged with JVC to form new a holding company, named as JVCKenwood.

Kenwood introduced its Sovereign line of components in 2001. In 2007, Kenwood discontinued its line of consumer audio receivers, home theater systems and other home electronics.

Today, products marketed by the company to consumer and commercial audiences fall within the home audio, car audio aftermarket and OEM, in car entertainment, amateur radio, professional two-way radio and DECT wireless intercom sectors.

Products

Speakers
Kenwood offers a range of speakers at different grades ranging from stage sound to hi-fidelity.

X series

Amateur radio transceivers

Kenwood has offered lines of HF, VHF/UHF, and portable amateur radio models, including some with built-in digital data modes (Automatic Packet Reporting System, built on AX.25 packet radio) and modems needed to send and receive these protocols.

KA Series hi-fi systems
Kenwood's series of "Integrated Amplifier" stereo power amplifiers, launched in 1977 and produced through the mid-1980s.  The design for most of these items features a true dual-mono path for stereo output (in other words, no electrical components are shared between left- and right-channel amplification).  Front plates were typically made in brushed aluminum with aluminum knobs and switches, glass covers, and in some cases analog VU meters.

Amplifiers in this series included (in no particular order)
 KA-1000 (11/1980)
 TRIO Supreme 1
 KA-2000 
 KA-2002 (09/1970)
 KA-2200 (10/1982)
 KA-3100
 KA-6100 (1977)
 KA-7002 (1971)
 KA-7100 (10/1976)
 KA-7300 (10/1975)
 KA-8100 / KA-8150 (06/1977)
 KA-8300 (with analog meters vs. 8100)
 KA-9100
 KA-900 (11/1980)
 KA-907 / KA-9900 (10/1978)
 KA-9100 / KA-9150 (1977)
 KA-6100 / (1978/9)

NV Series hi-fi systems
These were a series of mini hi-fi systems launched in 2000, featuring a new design aesthetic.

NV-301/701
The NV-301 and NV-701 both shared a three-layered half-mirrored design with the main difference lying in the specification of the two systems. The NV-301 was the basic model with two speakers and with a line input (marked for MiniDisc and DVD players) while the NV-701 was a 5.1 Dolby surround sound model with A/V inputs. Both featured a three-disc carousel, a cassette player with Dolby B noise reduction, a natural display, intelligent features and the ability to save up to 40 radio stations, utilising microcomputers to reduce the size of the unit.

Communications equipment

Kenwood is a brand of JVCKENWOOD Corporation making two-way radios including wireless DECT intercom systems, PMR446, dPMR446, dPMR, P25, DMR and NXDN. The Kenwood communications product range includes hand-portable and mobile terminals (including Intrinsically Safe and ATEX / IECEx hand-portables), repeaters, infrastructure and application solutions.

 See main article Kenwood Communications
 1949: High-frequency transformer passes the NHK (Japan Broadcasting Corporation) approval certificate for the first time in Japan.
 1955: Establishes the Tokyo and begins mass production of audio, communications and measuring equipment.
 1958: Company's first amateur radio goes on sale.
 1960: Renamed Trio Electronics, Inc.
 1962: Launches the industry's first transistor amplifier.
 1963: Sets up in the U.S., and begins full-scale overseas operations.
 1966: Introduces fully transistorised audio products for the first time in the industry.
 1969: The Trio TR-7100, 144 MHz amateur radio car transceiver goes on sale.
 1978: Introduces its first professional analogue two-way radios.
 1979: Establishes the company's first overseas production unit in Singapore.
 1983: Enters the U.S. land mobile radio market
 1986: Renamed Kenwood.
 1991: Enters the European licensed PMR (Private Mobile Radio) market.Begins selling license-free transceivers.Signs an official supply contract with McLaren to provide wireless radio equipment for the F1 championship.
 1995: The Mir space station carries Kenwood's amateur wireless equipment.TK-250 launched — Kenwood's first purpose designed PMR range for Europe.
 1996: Changes the subsidiary name from Trio-Kenwood to Kenwood, coinciding with the company's 50th anniversary.
 1997: Becomes Japan's first manufacturer to launch car-mounted DAB receivers.
 1999: Jointly develops the world's first mobile digital broadcast receiving system.Introduces Pro-Talk PMR446 license free two-way radio.
 2001: Releases its first digital transceiver operating on P25.
 2002: Develops a network interface module (NIM) for digital broadcasts via a communications satellite (CS).
 2005: Forms a technical and capital alliance with Icom to jointly research the standardisation of technical specifications for digital wireless radio equipment (NXDN).Kenwood Nagano Corp. acquires certification to “ISO/TS 16949”, the international standard for quality management specific to the automotive industry.
 2007: Kenwood announces 144/430 (440) MHz FM Dual bander TM-V71 series.Announcement of completion of acquisition of the U.S. systems-based communication company Zetron, Inc.Invested ¥20.0 billion and formed a strategic business alliance with Victor Company of Japan, Limited.
 2008: Notice of establishment of JVC Kenwood Holdings Inc.
 2010: Introduces its first ATEX certified analogue two-way radio.
 2011: Introduces NEXEDGE OTAP (Over The Air Programming)At the same time, JVC KENWOOD Holdings, Inc. changed its name to JVCKENWOOD Corporation. JVCKENWOOD Corporation completed an absorption of its three subsidiaries, Victor Company of Japan, Limited, Kenwood Corporation, and J&K Car Electronics Corporation.
 2013: Kenwood announces launch of the TS-990S amateur radio base station.Global launch of NEXEDGE ETSI certified dPMR digital two-way radios.
 2014: Acquires E.F. Johnson Technologies Inc.
2015: Launch of NX-5000 Series multi-protocol (NXDN/DMR/P25) capable hand-portable and mobile radios.
 2016: Launches TH-D74E VHF/UHF dual-band handheld amateur radio with built-in GPS
 2016: Launches ProTalk WD-K10 Series DECT (Digital Enhanced Cordless Telecommunications) Intercom systems.
2017: Launch of mid-tier NX-3000 Series multi-protocol (NXDN/DMR) capable hand-portable and mobile radios.
2017: Radio Activity S.r.l., a developer of digital multi-frequency, simulcast and trunked radio relay systems compliant with Digital Mobile Radio (DMR) standards.
2018: Launch of high-specification, dual PTT ProTalk TK-3601D hand-portable dPMR 446 radio.
2018: JVCKENWOOD acquires a minority share and announces a capital and business alliance with Tait International Ltd., a specialist in critical LMR and LTE communications.
2018: Dorna Sports announce a three-year contract with JVCKENWOOD as the as radio communications sponsor of MotoGP™.
2019: Implementation of the world's first, scalable Single site, 64-Channel, NXDN trunked communications system at the new Istanbul Airport, planned to become the world's largest on completion of its development phases in 2025.
2019: Launch of heavy-duty, dual PTT ProTalk TK-3701D hand-portable digital dPMR 446 radio.
2019: Launch of low-tier, FM analogue plus digital DMR/NXDN capable NX-1000 Series radios.
2022: JVCKENWOOD moves from the First Section of the Tokyo Stock Exchange to the Prime Market due to a revision of the Tokyo Stock Exchange's market classification.

Note

References

External links

Kenwood Transceivers by date of manufacture

Amateur radio companies
Audio amplifier manufacturers
Electronics companies established in 1946
Electronics companies disestablished in 2011
Consumer electronics brands
Headphones manufacturers
In-car entertainment
Japanese brands
JVCKenwood
Loudspeaker manufacturers
Manufacturing companies based in Tokyo
Microphone manufacturers
Navigation system companies
Companies formerly listed on the Tokyo Stock Exchange
Japanese companies established in 1946
Japanese companies disestablished in 2011
2011 mergers and acquisitions
Radio manufacturers